The 2019 United States hepatitis A outbreak was an occurrence of several declared outbreaks of the disease, hepatitis A, in locations in the United States including substantial instances in the states of Kentucky, Mississippi, Florida, and the city of Philadelphia, Pennsylvania, as well as an isolated food-related occurrence in New Jersey. As of October 2019, over 26,000 cases and 268 deaths were reported, with the largest number occurring in Kentucky, with over 4,000 cases.

The U.S. Centers for Disease Control and Prevention identified the outbreak as a continuation in a rise in the number of hepatitis A cases beginning in 2016. According to the CDC:

The outbreak has been worst in areas with high incidence of drug use, poor sanitation, and homelessness. Countermeasures to the outbreak have included vaccination campaigns at both state and federal levels.

On August 1, 2019, the Philadelphia Department of Health declared the hepatitis A outbreak to be a public health emergency, advising persons at risk to be vaccinated for the disease, and offering free vaccinations for those in contact with infected persons.

Florida Lieutenant Governor Jeanette Núñez tweeted "We urge vaccination and stress the importance of washing your hands regularly".

In New Jersey, it was announced in August 2019 that a food handler employed at the Mendham Golf and Tennis Club, in Mendham, New Jersey, had become infected with hepatitis A, and was deemed likely to be responsible for 27 other people becoming ill with the disease, one of whom died.

References

External links
 City Declares Public Health Emergency to Address Rise in Hepatitis A, Philadelphia Department of Health (August 1, 2019)
 Florida Surgeon General Scott A. Rivkees Issues Public Health Emergency in Response to Hepatitis A Outbreak, Florida Department of Health (August 1, 2019)
 State of Florida Department of Health Declaration of Public Health Emergency (August 1, 2019)
 Hepatitis A in Mississippi, Mississippi State Department of Health (July 30, 2019)

Hepatitis outbreaks
2019 disasters in the United States
2019 disease outbreaks
Hepatitis A
Disease outbreaks in the United States